A mad scene is an enactment of insanity in an opera or play. It was a popular convention of Italian and French opera in the early decades of the nineteenth century. 

Mad scenes were often created as a way to offer star singers a chance to show off their abilities, though many of them are also very dramatic. The vocal writing is often exciting and highly demanding, requiring immense skill.  Most mad scenes were composed for the soprano voice, but there are examples for the baritone and the tenor.

They are most popularly associated with works of the bel canto period, though examples may also be found in earlier works, such as George Frederick Handel's Orlando and Wolfgang Amadeus Mozart's Idomeneo. Almost all mad scenes were composed for either opere serie or opere semiserie; Gaetano Donizetti was probably the most famous exponent of the form.

The convention of writing mad scenes largely died out after the bel canto era, as composers sought to inject more realism into their operas.  More recently, some composers have returned to the form for dramatic effect, most notably Benjamin Britten in the final act of Peter Grimes.

Similar mad scene techniques have also appeared in ballets, such as Giselle.

The modern musical theatre has also been influenced by the operatic mad scene, as evidenced in Sweeney Todd and Sunset Boulevard.

Famous examples
George Frideric Handel
 Orlando ("Ah! stigie larve... Vaghe pupille")
 Hercules ("Where shall I fly?")

Johann Adolph Hasse
 Artaserse ("Pallido il sole")

Wolfgang Amadeus Mozart
  Idomeneo ("D'Oreste, d'Ajace")

Gioachino Rossini
 Ermione ("Essa corre al trionfo")
 Semiramide ("Deh! Ti ferma")

Gaetano Donizetti
 Lucia di Lammermoor ("Il dolce suono... Ardon gl'incensi... Spargi d'amaro pianto")
 Linda di Chamounix ("Linda! Ah che pensato")
 Maria Padilla
 Torquato Tasso
 Anna Bolena ("Piangete voi... Al dolce guidami... Coppia iniqua")

Vincenzo Bellini
 I puritani ("O rendetemi... Qui la voce sua soave... Vien, diletto, e in ciel la luna")
 Il Pirata ("Col sorriso d'innocenza... Oh, Sole! ti vela di tenebra fonda")
 La Sonnambula ("Oh! se una volta sola... Ah! non credea mirarti... Ah! non giunge uman pensiero")

Ambroise Thomas
 Hamlet ("Partagez-vous mes fleurs")

Giacomo Meyerbeer
 Dinorah ("Ombre légère")

Giuseppe Verdi
 Nabucco ("Chi mi toglie")
 Macbeth ("Una macchia")
 Attila (opera) ("Mentre gonfiarsi l'anima")

Nikolai Rimsky-Korsakov
 The Tsar's Bride ("Ivan Sergeyich, khochesh' v sad poydem")

Modest Mussorgsky 
 Boris Godunov ("Oi! Duschno, Duschno")

Richard Wagner
 Tristan und IsoldeAlban Berg 
 Wozzeck ("Oh-oh Andres!")

Benjamin Britten
 Peter Grimes ("Steady. There you are, nearly home")

Hans Werner Henze
  Elegy for Young LoversAndré Previn
 A Streetcar named DesireJohn Corigliano
 The Ghosts of Versailles ("They Are Always With Me")

Parodies
Jacques Offenbach
 Le pont des soupirs ("Ah! le Doge, ah! Les plombs, le canal Orfano l'Adriatique, c'est fini je suis folle")

Gilbert & Sullivan
 Ruddigore ("Cheerily carols the lark").
 The Grand Duke ("I have a rival! Frenzy-thrilled, I find you both together!").

Benjamin Britten
 A Midsummer Night's Dream (the Pyramus and Thisbe scene).

Leonard Bernstein
 Candide ("Glitter and be gay")

References

 Bibliography 
 Anderson, James (1993)  The Complete Dictionary of Opera & Operetta, New York
 Ewen, David  (1963) Encyclopedia of the Opera'', New York
 The Top 10 Mad Scenes in Opera WQXR Operavore retrieved 13-08-13

Opera terminology